Advance Aviation Jet (Advance Jet) is a Thai air charter operation registered in Bangkok, Thailand. Established in 2011, the company is specialized in business jet management and operation, as well as in other aviation-related activities, including consulting, flight support and ground handling. It works in partnership with three subsidiaries; Advance Aviation, SkyDance and Universal Aviation (Thailand).

An operations control center, is located at Advance Aviation Jet's headquarters in Bangkok, Thailand, Don Mueang International Airport.

History

Starting in February 2011 by Mr. Chai Nasylvanta, four years after successful inception of Advance Aviation Company Limited. Advance Aviation Jet receives AOC (Air Operator Certificate) from the CAAT (Civil Aviation Authority of Thailand, formerly known as the DCA) 

In October 2011, beginning with a registered capital of 150 million Baht (approximately 5 million US dollars) and 550 million Baht (approximately 16 million US dollars) subordinated loan from shareholders, the company operates without any external commercial debt, including aircraft acquisition in cash.

Headquarter 

Advance Aviation Jet is located at 499 Benchachinda Building Vibhavadhi-Rangsit Road, Ladyao, Jatujak, Bangkok Thailand

Based Airport

Bangkok International Airport, Bangkok, Thailand

Office

Bangkok International Airport
2311A, 2nd floor of Terminal 1, Vibhavadi-Rangsit Road, Sanambin Don Muang 10210, Thailand

Fleet 

Advance Aviation Jet's two Gulfstream G200

Gulfstream G200

References

External links 

 official website

Charter airlines of Thailand
2011 establishments in Thailand
Airlines established in 2011
Companies based in Bangkok